Macintosh Font X is a character encoding which is used by Kermit to represent text on the Apple Macintosh (but not by standard Mac OS fonts). It is a modification of Mac OS Symbol to include all characters in DEC Special Graphics and the DEC Technical Character Set (unifying the ⎷ and √ from the Technical Character Set).

� Characters at A4, A7, A9, D0, E1, and F1 do not have Unicode equivalents; these characters, along with the not sign at D8 are intended to assemble a 3x5 uppercase sigma.

See also
Macintosh Latin encoding, another Mac OS encoding used by Kermit.

Footnotes

References

Character sets
Latin